The ViS ViS-3 is a high wing, single-engine ultralight, designed and built in Ukraine. The production version is designated as KhAZ-30 (ХАЗ-30).

Design and development

The ViS-3 is a two-seat, side by side, conventionally laid out ultralight high-wing monoplane. It first flew on 8 October 2006 and its flight test programme led through the revised ViS-5 to the Kharkiv State Aviation Plant built KhAZ-30 (ХАЗ-30) production aircraft, which first appeared in public on 22 May 2012. The development programme has brought small but significant changes to the design, chiefly in the removal of forward sweep and the addition of dihedral and flaps.  It is mostly of metal construction, though with fabric-covered wings. These have straight edges and constant chord and are braced by a single streamlined strut on each side, forward leaning from the lower fuselage to the wing.

The fuselage is noticeably shallow, with a long cabin glazed ahead and behind the wing, both above and to the sides.  A  Rotax 912 ULS flat four engine in the nose drives a three-blade propeller.  The rectangular tailplane is set well back; the ViS-3 had mass balanced elevators, developed on the ViS-5 to include aerodynamic (horn) balances and slightly increased in span.  There is a tall fin and rudder, also straight-edged but swept; the rudder has a prominent trim tab. A fixed tricycle undercarriage has spring cantilever main legs and  cantilever-mounted, castoring nosewheel.

Variants
Data from Jane's All the World's Aircraft 2013-14, p. 656-7
ViS-3 First prototype, flown 8 October 2006.
ViS-5 Production prototype. Unswept wings with flaps and span  less than ViS-3, length  greater.
KhAZ-30 (ХАЗ-30) Designation of production aircraft.  heavier empty, 16% greater fuel capacity than ViS-3. Public debut 22 May 2012.

Specifications (ViS-3)

References

2000s Ukrainian ultralight aircraft